During the 2008–09 English football season, Ipswich Town competed in the Football League Championship.

Season summary
Ipswich Town had an average season in the Championship, finishing in ninth place, eight points away from the playoffs. Manager Jim Magilton was sacked in April after three seasons in charge of Ipswich and was replaced by former Sunderland boss Roy Keane.

Kit
Ipswich Town retained the previous season's home kit, manufactured by English company Mitre, although Marcus Evans became the new kit sponsor. An all-red strip with black trimmings was Town's away kit.

Players

First-team squad

Left club during season

Reserve squad

Coaching staff
Until 22 April

From 22 April:

Pre-season
Ipswich's preparations for the 2008–09 season included a pre-season training camp in Northern Ireland, including friendlies against Belfast based sides Cliftonville, Donegal Celtic and Glentoran.

Legend

Competitions

Football League Championship

League table

Legend

Ipswich Town's score comes first

Matches

FA Cup

League Cup

Transfers

Transfers in

Loans in

Transfers out

Loans out

Squad statistics
All statistics updated as of end of season

Appearances and goals

|-
! colspan=14 style=background:#dcdcdc; text-align:center| Goalkeepers

|-
! colspan=14 style=background:#dcdcdc; text-align:center| Defenders

|-
! colspan=14 style=background:#dcdcdc; text-align:center| Midfielders

|-
! colspan=14 style=background:#dcdcdc; text-align:center| Forwards

|-
! colspan=14 style=background:#dcdcdc; text-align:center| Players transferred out during the season

|-

Goalscorers

Clean sheets

Disciplinary record

Starting 11
Considering starts in all competitions

Awards

Player awards

Notes

References

External links
 Ipswich Town squad for 2008–09 season
 Kits for 2008–09 Championship clubs

Ipswich Town F.C. seasons
Ipswich Town F.C.